Cochise Technology District  is a school district in Cochise County, Arizona. It is the county's only joint technological education district, serving eight high school districts. CTD was founded in 2001 with seven of the eight high schools on board; Douglas joined in 2004.

Member school districts
 Benson Unified School District
 Bowie Unified School District
 Douglas Unified School District
 San Simon Unified School District
 St. David Unified School District
 Tombstone Unified School District
 Valley Union High School District
 Willcox Unified School District

References

External links
 

School districts in Cochise County, Arizona
2001 establishments in Arizona
School districts established in 2001